During the 1999–2000 English football season, Charlton Athletic F.C. competed in the Football League First Division.

Season summary
Alan Curbishley and his Charlton side won the First Division title to regain promotion to the FA Carling Premiership for the 2000-2001 season at the first time of asking.

A key player in the previous season's unsuccessful bid to avoid relegation, Richard Rufus remained with the club and enjoyed a very productive season scoring six goals and helping Charlton to win the First Division title.

Final league table

Results
Charlton Athletic's score comes first

Legend

Football League First Division

FA Cup

League Cup

First-team squad
Squad at end of season

Left club during season

References

Notes

Charlton Athletic F.C. seasons
Charlton Athletic